Lawn bowls men's triples at the 2018 Commonwealth Games was held at the Broadbeach Bowls Club in the Gold Coast, Australia from April 5 to 8. A total of 60 athletes from 20 associations participated in the event.

Sectional play
The top two from each section advance to the knockout stage.

Section A

Section B

Section C

Section D

Knockout stage

External links
Results

References

Men's triples